Monty Ross is an American filmmaker. He is most recognized from his work with Spike Lee including, She's Gotta Have It, Do the Right Thing and Malcolm X.

Film making
Ross is highly acclaimed independent filmmaker who co-produced films with Spike Lee, with whom he co-founded 40 Acres and a Mule Filmworks. They first met at Clark Atlanta University where both took mass media courses and were student members of a film club known as the AUC Newsreel. They perfected their film writing and production skills while Spike was enrolled in nearby Morehouse College and Monty continued his students at CAU. courses. Ross appeared in Lee's master's degree thesis film, Joe's Bed-Stuy Barbershop: We Cut Heads. He co-produced many films with Lee through the 1980s and 1990s, including She's Gotta Have It, School Daze, Do the Right Thing, Jungle Fever, Malcolm X and Crooklyn.

Following the production of Crooklyn, Ross independently completed several works. Among the film projects he served as a lead on, were as producer of Keep the Faith, Baby, a biopic about Adam Clayton Powell Jr. He also produced Escaping Jersey and directed Reasons during this period.

On rejoining 40 Acres, Ross became the coordinator for the company's community outreach programmes, recruiting interns to assist with the production of Inside Man. Ross is currently working with Spike Lee on the "She's Gotta Have It TV Spin-off of the movie that he co-produced. Ross is also a college professor, serving as an adjunct professor, lecturer and frequent guest speaker at universities including VCU, Old Dominion, Clark Atlanta, and Florida A&M University.  

In 2019, Ross directed The Opera Game, set in the 19th century in New Orleans, LA. The film won the Filmmakers Choice award at the 2019 San Diego Black Film Festival. 

Since 2017 Ross has served as the President of Operations for Soulidifly Productions. Currently, he is serving as the Filmmaker-in-Residence at Ours Studios LLC, a Decatur, GA-based film production company that is releasing its first historical documentary, "As If We Were Ghosts." The 60-minute documentary will debut in June 2022 on Georgia Public Broadcasting. Ours Studios is a Black-owned and financed company that produces film and documentaries as well as offers a wide range of production services and spaces. In addition, its state-of-the-art studios rentals are designed to make audio, video and livestreams for podcasts and vlogs and has two converted warehouses dedicated for film, video and photography productions. “As If We Were Ghosts” is about how the athletic and musical accomplishments of students in Black high schools in Georgia were ignored and erased from history.

Theatre
As well as filmmaking, Ross was also involved with Atlanta Street Theatre, where he spent some of his early career as an actor.

Personal life
Ross was born in Omaha, Nebraska, his parents divorced when he was young. He was married to Carol Ross.

References

External links

American film producers
Spike Lee
Living people
African-American film producers
1957 births